PB-32 Kharan is a constituency of the Provincial Assembly of Balochistan.

See also

 PB-31 Chagai
 PB-33 Nushki

References

External links
 Election commission Pakistan's official website
 Awazoday.com check result
 Balochistan's Assembly official site

Constituencies of Balochistan